Black Holm is a small tidal island in the Orkney Islands, near Copinsay to the west of Corn Holm off the north-eastern coast of Scotland.

Geography and geology
Corn Holm is made up of red sandstone.

At low tide it is connected to Corn Holm which is in turn connected to Copinsay by a stretch called "Isle Rough".

References

Islands of the Orkney Islands
Tidal islands of Scotland